Brain stimulation may refer to:

Brain Stimulation, a medical journal published by Elsevier
Brain stimulation reward, a process of directly stimulating reward centers in the brain
Cranial electrotherapy stimulation
Deep brain  stimulation, a surgical treatment that stimulates parts of the brain with electrical impulses
Electrical brain stimulation, direct or indirect stimulation of the brain with electricity for therapeutic or research purposes
Low field magnetic stimulation
RNS System, a deep brain stimulation  treatment for epilepsy patients
Transcranial alternating current stimulation, delivering an oscillatory current over the occipital cortex 
Transcranial direct current stimulation, the direct application of weak dc electrical currents to neurons
Transcranial magnetic stimulation, the stimulation of the brain by inducing magnetic fields
Vagus nerve stimulation, a medical treatment that involves electrical stimulation of the vagus, or tenth cranial nerve
Wirehead, an electronic brain implant to stimulate the pleasure centers of the brain